A holster is a device used to hold or restrict the undesired movement of a handgun. 

Holster may also refer to:

 Police duty belt, a belt to allow the carrying of various tools 
 Sword holster or scabbard, a holster for swords 
 Knife holster, a holster for knives
 Phone holster, a holster for carrying mobile phones

People with the surname
 Fredrik Holster (born 1988), Swedish footballer